Laguna Beach (Laguna, Spanish for "Lagoon") is a city in Orange County, California, United States. Located in Southern California along the Pacific Ocean, this seaside resort city has a mild year-round climate, scenic coves, and environmental preservation efforts. The population in the 2020 census was 23,032.

Historically settled by Paleoindians, the Tongva people, and then Mexico, the location became part of the United States following the Mexican–American War. Laguna Beach was settled in the 1870s, officially founded in 1887, and in 1927 its current government was incorporated as a city. The city adopted the council–manager form of government in 1944. The city has remained relatively isolated from urban encroachment by its surrounding hills, limited highway access, and dedicated greenbelt.

Tourism is the primary industry with an estimated six million people visiting the community annually. Large annual events include the Pageant of the Masters, Festival of Arts, Sawdust Art Festival, Art-A-Fair, Bluewater Music Festival, and Kelpfest.

History
Laguna Beach was the site of a prehistoric paleoindian civilization. In 1933, the first fossilized skull of a paleoindian found in California was uncovered during construction on St. Ann's Drive. Known as "Laguna Woman", the skull originally was radiocarbon dated to more than 17,000 BP, but revised measurements suggest it originated during the Holocene era, 11,700 years BP. Subsequent research has found several prehistoric encampment sites in the area.

The indigenous people of the Laguna Beach area were the Tongva. Aliso Creek served as a territorial boundary between Gabrieleno and Acjachemen groups, or Juanenos, named by Spanish missionaries who first encountered them in the 1500s. After the Mexican–American War ended in 1848, the area of Alta California was ceded to the United States. The treaty provided that Mexican land grants be honored and Rancho San Joaquin, which included north Laguna Beach, was granted to José Antonio Andres Sepúlveda. Following a drought in 1864, Sepúlveda sold the property to James Irvine. The majority of Laguna Beach was one of the few parcels of coastal land in Southern California that never was included in any Mexican land grant.

Settlers arrived after the American Civil War. In Laguna Beach, settlers planted groves of eucalyptus trees. In 1876, the brothers William and Lorenzo Nathan "Nate" Brooks purchased tracts of land in Bluebird Canyon at present-day Diamond Street. They subdivided their land, built homes and initiated the small community of Arch Beach. In his book, History of Orange County, California (1921), Samuel Armor cited the permanent homestead of Nate Brooks as the beginning of the modern day town and described Brooks as the "Father of Laguna Beach".

The community in Laguna Canyon and around the main beach expanded during the 1880s. The city officially founded a post office in 1887 under the name Lagona, but the postmaster in 1904, Nicholas Isch, successfully petitioned for a name correction to Laguna Beach. By then Laguna Beach already had developed into a tourist destination. Hubbard Goff built a large hotel at Arch Beach in 1886, which later was moved and added to Joseph Yoch's Laguna Beach Hotel built in 1888 on the main beach. Visitors from local cities pitched tents on the beaches for vacation during the warm summers.

The scenic beauty of the isolated coastline and hills attracted plein-air painters in the early 1900s. William Wendt, Frank Cuprien, and Edgar Payne among others settled there and formed the Laguna Beach Art Association. The first art gallery opened in 1918 and later became the Laguna Beach Art Museum. Precursors to The Festival of Arts and the Pageant of the Masters began in 1921, and eventually were established in their present-day form by Roy Ropp in 1936. Due to its proximity to Hollywood, Laguna also became a favorite filming location. Starting in 1913, dozens of silent films were made at local coves with Harold Lloyd, Mary Pickford, Douglas Fairbanks Jr., and others. Actors and film crews stayed during long production shoots at the Arch Beach Tavern on the hillside above Moss Street.

The arrival of painters, photographers, filmmakers, and writers established Laguna Beach as a noted artist community. Although there only were approximately 300 residents in 1920, a large proportion of them worked in creative fields. The small town remained isolated until 1926 because the long, winding Laguna Canyon road served as the only access. With the completion of the Pacific Coast Highway in 1926, a population boom was expected. To protect the small-town atmosphere of the art colony, residents who called themselves "Lagunatics" pushed for incorporation. The municipal government for Laguna Beach incorporated as a city on June 29, 1927. The city has experienced steady population growth since that time, rising from 1,900 residents in 1927 to more than 10,000 in 1962, and becoming four times larger in area.

Many creative, bohemian, and wealthy people have made Laguna Beach their home. They have added to the local culture by providing a theme for the small town. Adventurer Richard Halliburton built his Hangover House on the slopes of South Laguna. Hildegarde Hawthorne, granddaughter of the novelist Nathaniel Hawthorne, described Laguna "as a child of that deathless search, particularly by persons who devote their lives to painting or writing, or for some place where beauty and cheapness and a trifle of remoteness hobnob together in a delightful companionship."

Laguna Beach was the Southern California epicenter of the 'alternative' hippie culture in the late 1960s and early 1970s. In early 1967, John Griggs and other founding members of  the Brotherhood of Eternal Love relocated from Modjeska Canyon to the Woodland Drive neighborhood of Laguna Beach, which they later renamed "Dodge City". Timothy Leary lived in a beach house on Gaviota Drive. The Utsava Rajneesh Meditation Center was located on Laguna Canyon Road and was the last remaining commune in the United States for followers of the spiritual teacher and guru Osho, Bhagwan Shree Rajneesh.

The city was deemed a smoke-free place by Laguna Beach Council on May 23, 2017. Ordinance 1624 was imposed by the Beach Council to prohibit smoking in all public places in the city.

1993 fire
The National Fire Protection Association listed it as the seventh-largest loss wildland fire in the United States. To avoid a recurrence of the damage to animals that occurred during the fire, a wildlife corridor is being created between Laguna Beach and the Cleveland National Forest in order to ensure that animals can retreat fire safely if needed.

Geography
Laguna Beach is part of the Los Angeles metropolitan area. It is bordered by the Pacific Ocean on the southwest, Crystal Cove State Park on the northwest, Laguna Woods on the northeast, Aliso Viejo and Laguna Niguel on the east, and Dana Point on the southeast. It also borders the unincorporated community of Emerald Bay, which divides the northernmost part of its coastline (Irvine Cove) from the rest of the city's coast.

The land in and around Laguna Beach rises quickly from the shoreline into the hills and canyons of the San Joaquin Hills. Because of its hilly topography and surrounding parklands, few roads run into or out of town; only the Coast Highway connecting to Newport Beach to the northwest and to Dana Point to the south, and State Route 133 crossing the hills in a northeastern direction through Laguna Canyon. Parts of Laguna Beach border the Aliso/Wood Canyons Regional Park.

The natural landscape of beaches, rocky bluffs, and craggy canyons have been noted as sources of inspiration for plein air painters and landscape photographers who have settled in the Laguna Beach since the early 1900s. The hills also are known internationally for mountain biking. Laguna Coast Wilderness Park is a  wilderness area in the hills surrounding Laguna Beach. This park features coastal canyons, ridgeline views, and the only natural lakes in Orange County. Wildlife that can be found on Laguna Beach includes the Lined Shore Crab, Black Oystercatchers, Barred Sand Bass, Spiny Lobsters and the Great White Egret.

Climate
Under the Köppen climate classification, Laguna Beach has a Cold semi-arid climate classified as BSk. The weather is considered mild with abundant sunshine all year. However, the ocean surface temperatures along the beaches of Laguna Beach may vary by several degrees from the average, dependent upon offshore winds, air temperature, and sunshine.

Demographics

2010
The 2010 United States Census reported that 22,723 people, 10,821 households, and 5,791 families resided in the city. The 12,923 housing units  averaged 1,315.9 per square mile (508.1/km). The racial makeup of Laguna Beach was 90.9% White (85.7% non-Hispanic White), 0.8% African American, 0.3% Native American, 3.6% Asian, 1.51% from other races, and 2.9% from two or more races. About 7.3% of the population was Hispanic or Latino of any race.

The census reported that 99.6% of the population lived in households, and 0.4% lived in noninstitutionalized group quarters. Of the 10,821 households, 20.1% had children under the age of 18 living in them, 43.6% were opposite-sex married couples living together, 6.3% had a female householder with no husband present, and 3.6% had a male householder with no wife present. 5.2% of households were unmarried opposite-sex partnerships, and 2.8% were same-sex married couples or partnerships. About 35.2% of households were made up of individuals, and 10.4% had someone living alone who was 65 years of age or older. The average household size was 2.09. The average family size was 2.72.

The population was distributed as 16.1% under the age of 18, 4.8% aged 18 to 24, 23.4% aged 25 to 44, 37.4% aged 45 to 64, and 18.3% who were 65 years of age or older. The median age was 50.6. For every 100 females, there were 100.6 males. For every 100 females age 18 and over, there were 99.8 males.

Of 12,923 housing units, 60.0% were owner-occupied and 40.0% were occupied by renters. The homeowner vacancy rate was 1.7%; the rental vacancy rate was 7.7%, and 64.6% of the population lived in owner-occupied housing units and 35.0% lived in rental housing units.

During 2009–2013, Laguna Beach had a median household income of $94,325, with 6.3% of the population living below the federal poverty line.

2000
As of the census of 2000, there were 23,727 people, 11,511 households, and 5,778 families residing in the city. The racial makeup of the city was 91.99% White, 0.80% African American, 0.36% Native American, 2.08% Asian, 0.08% Pacific Islander, 2.21% from other races, and 2.47% from two or more races. Hispanic or Latino of any race were 6.62% of the population.

There were 11,511 households, out of which 18.5% had children under the age of 18 living with them, 40.9% were married couples living together, 6.3% had a female householder with no husband present, and 49.8% were non-families. 36.7% of all households were made up of individuals, and 8.1% had someone living alone who was 65 years of age or older. The average household size was 2.05 and the average family size was 2.69.

In the city, the population was spread out, with 15.8% under the age of 18, 4.2% from 18 to 24, 32.9% from 25 to 44, 33.9% from 45 to 64, and 13.3% who were 65 years of age or older. The median age was 43 years. For every 100 females, there were 103.7 males. For every 100 females age 18 and over, there were 104.0 males.

According to a 2007 estimate, the median income for a household in the city was $90,017, and the median income for a family was $146,562. Males had a median income of $66,221 versus $46,138 for females. The per capita income for the city was $58,732. About 2.8% of families and 5.1% of the population were below the poverty line, including 4.7% of those under age 18 and 4.3% of those age 65 or over.

Crime rate 
According to an analysis by NeighborhoodScout.com, Laguna Beach has a higher crime rate than the national average of communities of all population sizes in the United States. The chance of becoming a victim of a violent crime is 1 in 200 and of a property crime is 1 in 36.

Arts and culture

The Laguna Art Museum is rooted in the development of Laguna Beach as an art community with the creation of the Laguna Beach Art Association in 1918. Located beside the main beach, the museum focuses on the art of California. The Pageant of the Masters, founded in 1933, is held annually during the summer months. The unique show presents recreations of famous artworks using real people as models. Community organizations also host several long-running art festivals during the summer season.

The Festival of Arts Fine Art Show, which underwent a major renovation in 2017, originated in the 1930s. It showcases juried works by 140 Orange County artists, and its stage provides a venue for daily musical performances in July and August of each year. The Sawdust Art Festival was founded in 1965 as a counterculture alternative to the Festival of Arts. It exhibits non-juried crafts and arts on a dedicated  site. The Art-A-Fair began in 1966, built an exhibition site in 1977 and exhibits juried works of 125 artists from outside the area.

The Laguna Playhouse, founded in 1920, is noted as the "oldest continuously running theatre on the west coast". The playhouse provides professional stage productions in its 420-seat Moulton Theater, as well as performances by the Laguna Playhouse Youth Theatre program. The Irvine Bowl is a 2600-seat amphitheater used for the Pageant of the Masters program and for occasional concerts.

The Laguna Beach Plein Air Painting Invitational is held annually in October. Some of North America's plein air landscape painters are invited to participate in the week-long events including public paint outs, artist meet and greets, and educational activities.

The Laguna Beach Arts Commission sponsors a weekly Summer Concert in the Park series at Bluebird Park and Heisler Park. The Laguna Beach Chamber Music Society holds an annual chamber music festival during the winter season. Laguna is also home to the annual Bluewater Music Festival, and Kelpfest held on Earth Day, to raise awareness of the importance that kelp plays in ocean habitat.

Sports

Laguna Beach has a surfing history centered on a five-block stretch of rocky reefs between Brooks and St. Ann's Streets. The Brooks Street Surfing Classic, begun in 1955, is a "contender for the world's longest running surf competition," according to the Encyclopedia of Surfing.  The competition is held only when peak swell conditions occur during a four-month-long window in the summer and has been held 52 times from 1955 to 2015.  Participation is open only to Laguna Beach residents.  Notable participants have included Hobie Alter, Mickey Munoz, and Tom Morey.

Started in 1976, the 'Vic' Skimboarding World Championship is held at Aliso Beach in Laguna Beach and is the longest running skim boarding contest on the pro circuit.

The Laguna Open Volleyball Tournament began in 1955 and, according to tournament directors, it is the second oldest volleyball tournament in the United States. Participants have included several Olympic gold medalists, including Chris Marlowe, Dusty Dvorak, Scott Fortune, Dain Blanton and Gene Selznick, who won the first seven competitions.

Parks and recreation
Laguna's foothill trails are known internationally for mountain biking. Mountain bike hall of fame legend Hans Rey makes his home in Laguna Beach, as do the Rads, pioneers of mountain biking going back to the 1970s.

The U.S. Open for Lawnbowling is held annually at the lawn bowling field at Heisler Park.

Government
Laguna Beach was first settled in the 1870s, but was founded officially in 1887 and, in 1927 it incorporated as a city. Beginning in 1944, a council-manager form of government was adopted. Residents of Laguna Beach elect five non-partisan council members who serve four-year staggered terms, with elections occurring every two years. The position of mayor is non-elected and chosen annually among the members of the city council. The council serves to pass ordinances, approve a budget, and hire the city manager and city attorney. The city manager oversees administrative operations and the appointment of department heads. In 2011, John Pietig was hired as city manager following the retirement of his boss, Ken Frank who, after 31 years, was one of the longest-serving city managers in Orange County history.

The city clerk and city treasurer are elected by popular vote and serve four-year terms.

County, state, and federal representation
Laguna Beach is located in the Fifth District of the Orange County Board of Supervisors and is currently represented by Republican Lisa Bartlett.

According to the California Secretary of State, as of February 10, 2019, Laguna Beach has 17,064 registered voters. Of those, 6,509 (38.12%) are registered Democrats, 5,042 (29.55%) are registered Republicans, and 4,620 (27.07%) have declined to state a political party/are independents.

Laguna Beach is a Democratic stronghold in presidential elections due to its cultural liberalism and LGBTQ+ community, as no Republican has won the city since George H. W. Bush in 1988. In 2008, Laguna Beach was one of only four incorporated cities in Orange County (along with Aliso Viejo, Costa Mesa, and Irvine) to reject Proposition 8, the ballot initiative that revoked marriage rights for same-sex couples in California. That same year during the Democratic presidential preference primary, Laguna Beach was one of three cities in Orange County where Democrats favored Barack Obama over Hillary Rodham Clinton.

Education

Primary and secondary
The Laguna Beach Unified School District manages public education for city residents. The district includes one high school (Laguna Beach High School), one middle school (Thurston Middle School), and two elementary schools (El Morro Elementary School and Top of the World Elementary School). One private elementary school, St. Catherine of Siena Parish School, is overseen by the Roman Catholic Diocese of Orange.

Higher education
The Laguna College of Art & Design (LCAD) is a small private college located in Laguna Canyon. It was founded in 1961 by the Festival of Arts and Laguna Art Museum as the Laguna Beach School of Art. LCAD offers bachelor of arts degrees in drawing and painting, illustration, animation, graphic design, and game art, and master of fine arts degrees in painting and drawing. In 2013, enrollment was approximately 450 students.

Media

Laguna Beach is part of the Los Angeles media market. Laguna Beach also has its own FM community radio station, KXRN-LP. The community is served by an online newspaper, Stu News Laguna, and one weekly print newspaper, the Laguna Beach Independent.

Infrastructure

Fire protection in Laguna Beach is provided by the Laguna Beach Fire Department, and law enforcement by the Laguna Beach Police Department. Marine safety services are provided jointly by Laguna Beach City Lifeguards in north Laguna Beach and by Orange County Lifeguards in south Laguna Beach.

Laguna Beach has used goats for its fuel reduction and vegetation management program since the early 1990s.

Notable people

Conservation and environment

Laguna Beach is the only Orange County city protected by a dedicated greenbelt inland and bluebelt seaward. In 1968, local conservationists founded Laguna Greenbelt and began a drive to conserve a horseshoe of hills and canyons surrounding Laguna Beach.

The creation of the  Laguna Coast Wilderness Park as a protected area began in the late 1980s and early 1990s when local artists, activists and politicians rallied to preserve Laguna Canyon. With the environmentally focused Laguna Canyon Project and its photographic mural, "The Tell," as backdrop and stimulus, Laguna citizens forged a partnership to prevent construction of a  housing project in the canyon. An exhibition on the Laguna Canyon Project, titled "The Canyon Project: Artivism," was held at Laguna Art Museum in 2015–16. Today the Wilderness Park and Laguna Canyon within it are designated as open space in perpetuity.

The Laguna Beach State Marine Reserve (LBSMR), which extends from Irvine Cove to Treasure Island Beach, was established in 2012, to make most of the coastal area a no-take zone. Docents of the Laguna Ocean Foundation provide monitoring and education at tidepools within the LBSMR. In addition, the  Crystal Cove State Park abuts the northern border of Laguna Beach.

As a result of Laguna’s Marine Protected Area "no-take zones" the local waters teem with fish, including sheepshead and large calico bass.

American Craftsman Bungalows from the early 1900s dot the downtown and South Laguna areas. Between 1980 and 1981, the city conducted the Laguna Beach Historic Survey, a citywide block-by-block study which noted the location of pre-1940 buildings and determined which had historic significance. 706 homes and structures in Laguna Beach were classified as historically significant.

Laguna Beach is the tenth official Transition Town in the U.S. In February 2007, Laguna's city council unanimously voted to join the U.S. Mayors Climate Initiative, and in April 2013 became the first Orange County city to make a formal request that the San Onofre Nuclear Reactor not be restarted after its January 2012 shutdown. The Aliso Creek Water Reclamation Facility went into operation in 2014. The facility removes polluted runoff in Aliso Creek, improves ocean water quality, and creates locally recycled water. With a grant from Cal Trans, the city is undertaking a transition plan to implement Complete Streets for all users. A north–south bicycle route with signs and sharrows was completed through town in 2014. Laguna Beach passed a citywide "Idaho stop" ordinance for cyclists, a no-plastic-bag ordinance and a no-plastic-bottle purchasing policy for its government.

In popular culture
The 1972 instrumental by Black Sabbath "Laguna Sunrise" was inspired by a sunrise guitarist Tony Iommi witnessed after a night of partying. 
In 2004, MTV created a reality television show entitled Laguna Beach: The Real Orange County, which aired for three seasons.

Laguna Beach is the setting for the Netflix television series Dead to Me.

Sister cities
Laguna Beach has three sister cities:

  Menton, France
  San José del Cabo, Mexico
  St Ives, United Kingdom

See also
List of beaches in California

References

External links

 
 Laguna Beach Visitors & Conference Bureau - Tourism

 
Artist colonies
Cities in Orange County, California
Incorporated cities and towns in California
Populated coastal places in California
San Joaquin Hills